In the mathematical field of graph theory, a good spanning tree   of an embedded planar graph  is a rooted spanning tree of   whose non-tree edges satisfy the following conditions.
  is a set of non-tree edges, they terminate in red zone
  is a set of tree edges, they are children of 
   is a set of  non-tree edges, they terminate in green zone

Formal definition 

Let  be a plane graph.

 [Cond1]  does not have a non-tree edge , ; and
 [Cond2] the edges of  incident to the vertex  excluding  can be partitioned into three disjoint (possibly empty) sets  and  satisfying the following conditions (a)-(c)
 (b) Edges  of set ,  and  appear clockwise in this order from the edge .

Applications 
In monotone drawing of graphs, in 2-visibility representation of graphs.

Finding good spanning tree 
Every planar graph  has an embedding  such that  contains a good spanning tree. Not all embeddings of  contain a good spanning tree.

See also 
 Spanning tree
 Schnyder realizer

References 

Computational problems in graph theory
Spanning tree
Planar graphs